Carmassi is a family name of Italian origin. It may refer to:

 Arturo Carmassi, Italian sculptor and painter
 Denny Carmassi, American drummer
 Giulio Carmassi, Italian composer and  producer 
 Massimo Carmassi, Italian architect

Italian-language surnames